Zdeněk Grygera (born 14 May 1980) is a Czech former professional footballer who played as a defender.

Club career

Early career
Grygera began his career at Petra Drnovice before moving to Sparta Prague.

Ajax

In July 2003, he was signed by Dutch club Ajax for an undisclosed fee, estimated to be around €3.5 million. His first goal came for the club came in September 2004, a 5–0 thrashing away at Den Bosch. He soon became a fan favorite, especially after scoring against bitter rivals Feyenoord in the April Klassieker.

Juventus
On 10 January 2007, it was confirmed by Ajax Technical Director Martin van Geel that Grygera would be leaving for Juventus on a Bosman transfer when his contract with Ajax expired in June 2007. He was supposed to transfer after the 2006 FIFA World Cup, but the Calciopoli scandal prevented him from doing so. He expressed his delight over the possibility of playing with one of his Czech compatriots, Pavel Nedvěd.

Due to his versatility, he soon established himself in the Juventus starting lineup. In March, he scored and subsequently set up David Trezeguet's goal in a 2–0 win over Genoa, and also scored a last-gasp equalizer in the club's Derby d'Italia fixture against rivals Internazionale on 18 April 2009.

Fulham
In summer 2011, Grygera still had one year left to run on his contract at Juventus, but it was rescinded by mutual consent on 30 August 2011. The following day, he joined English Premier League side Fulham. He received the number 26 jersey and made his Fulham debut on 15 September 2011 in the UEFA Europa League against Twente. Grygera suffered an anterior cruciate ligament rupture during a league match against Tottenham Hotspur on 6 November 2011, which kept him out for the rest of the season.

Grygera's contract with Fulham was up for renewal at the end of the 2011–12 season. Manager Martin Jol, said, "Hopefully he can prove himself before the end of August. If he proves he's fit I would like to keep him."

On 6 December 2012, Jol confirmed that Grygera had decided to retire from football to concentrate instead on returning to full fitness.

International career
Grygera was part of the Czech side which won the UEFA U-21 Championships in 2002. A former Czech youth international, Grygera played for the Czech Republic at UEFA Euro 2004, the 2006 FIFA World Cup and UEFA Euro 2008. At the 2006 World Cup, Grygera's run and cross set up the opening goal for Jan Koller in the Czechs' first game against the United States, which they won 3–0.

At Euro 2008, Grygera was involved in a rough challenge with Swiss striker Alexander Frei during the first half of the tournament's opening game, which tore Frei's knee ligaments and forced the player out of rest of the tournament. He was a regular during 2010 World Cup qualifying, playing in six of the ten qualifiers, but was not able to help the Czechs qualify for a second consecutive World Cup. Grygera made his 65th and final national appearance in October 2009.

Style of play 
Grygera was known for his work-rate, competitiveness, and versatility, and usually played as a full-back, wing-back, or winger along right flank, although he was also capable of playing on the left, or as a centre-back; while being solid defensively, he was also known for his ability to get forward and for his all-round good quality of play.

Honours
Sparta Prague
Gambrinus Liga: 2000–01, 2002–03

Ajax
Eredivisie: 2003–04
KNVB Cup: 2005–06, 2006–07
Johan Cruijff Shield: 2005

References

External links
 
 
 Premier League profile
 

1980 births
Living people
People from Přílepy (Kroměříž District)
Czech footballers
Czech Republic youth international footballers
Czech Republic under-21 international footballers
Czech Republic international footballers
Association football defenders
FC Fastav Zlín players
AC Sparta Prague players
AFC Ajax players
Juventus F.C. players
Fulham F.C. players
Czech First League players
Eredivisie players
Serie A players
Premier League players
UEFA Euro 2004 players
2006 FIFA World Cup players
UEFA Euro 2008 players
Czech expatriate footballers
Czech expatriate sportspeople in the Netherlands
Expatriate footballers in the Netherlands
Czech expatriate sportspeople in Italy
Expatriate footballers in Italy
Czech expatriate sportspeople in England
Expatriate footballers in England
FK Drnovice players
Sportspeople from the Zlín Region